is an album by Tsukiko Amano, named after the famous American actress Winona Ryder.  It is a collection of all the B-side tracks from the single 箱庭 (Hakoniwa) to 鮫 (Same). It was released on March 3, 2004, labeled under Otokura Records and distributed by Pony Canyon.

Track listing
 G.B.〜声変わりRiders mix〜  (G.B〜Change of Voice Riders mix〜)
 ステロイド〜声変わりRiders mix〜 (Steroid〜Change of Voice Riders mix〜)
 スパイダー〜月に吠えろ！〜 ( Spider〜Howl at the Moon〜)
 亀 (in ラウンジ) (Turtle(in Lounge))
 Pleasure〜エンジェルタイプ〜 (Pleasure〜Angel Type〜)
 ミサイル (Missile)
 人魚 (Mermaid)
 象〜半ナマ〜 (Elephant〜Half Pure〜)
 巨大獣〜第二次形態〜 (Gigantic Beast〜The second form〜)
 BOGGY！(原宿にて) (BOGGY！(At Harajuku) )

Tsuki Amano albums
2004 albums